Annette Thychosen (born 30 August 1968) is a Danish footballer who played as a forward for the Denmark national team. She appeared 46 times, scoring 13 goals. She was part of the team at the 1991 FIFA World Cup, UEFA European Championship 1991, and UEFA European Championship 1993. At the club level, she played for Odense BK in Denmark.

References

External links
 

1968 births
Living people
Danish women's footballers
Denmark women's international footballers
Place of birth missing (living people)
1991 FIFA Women's World Cup players
Women's association football forwards
Denmark international footballers
Association football forwards